Qiam, also spelled , , , is an Arabic word (قيم) that is also used in Arabic-based languages.

Qiam 1 is a missile manufactured in Iran.
Qiam is a village in Iran.